Mai-Ndombe District was a district of pre-2015  Bandundu Province in the Democratic Republic of the Congo. It covered roughly the same area as the colonial-era Lac Léopold II District. In 2015, it was merged with Plateaux District, all in pre-2015 Bandundu Province, to form the new Mai-Ndombe Province.

Location

Mai-Ndombe extends north from the Kasai River and is separated from the Congo River to the east by the Plateaux District.
The district takes its name from the large but shallow Lake Mai-Ndombe, which covers  but expands to double or triple that size in the rainy season.
The Lukenie River flows from the east and runs through the southern part of the district.
The Lukenie joins with the Fimi River, which drains Lake Mai-Ndombe and continues westward to join the Kasai at Mushie.

The concession extends over the Ntomba, Baselenge, and Bolia sectors.
This is the first REDD+ community-based forest conservation project in the country.

Economy
Even by the standards of the country, Mai-Ndombe District is relatively undeveloped. During the colonial era the region was a major producer of rubber, copal, textile fibers, palm nuts and lumber. Since independence it has been neglected. Buildings such as schools, health centers, hospitals, offices and churches from the earlier period have been allowed to deteriorate. Although roads in Kutu territory have been maintained by non-government organizations, Oswhe territory in the east no longer has any roads or bridges. Ports have also been abandoned. The Forest Development Corporation SODEFOR employs several hundred workers, and a few other companies also operate in the district.

Bokoro, Inongo, Kiri, Kutu, Nioki, Oshwe

Administrative divisions
Mai-Ndombe included the following territory-level division units:

Territories
 Inongo
 Kiri
 Kutu
 Nioki
 Oshwe

The administrative center is the town of Inongo on the east shore of Lake Mai-Ndombe.

Under the February 2006 constitution, Plateaux District, Mai-Ndombe District and the city of Bandundu were to be combined into a new Mai-Ndombe Province, with the change taking effect before 18 February 2009. 
As of October 2010, this had not taken place, and the ruling party was calling for a further extension to the deadline.

References

Districts of Bandundu Province
Mai-Ndombe Province